There were several notable noble families of Ottoman Bosnia, many of which have living descendants today and are predominantly Bosniaks. These families are commonly called begovske porodice ("bey families") and most were of Islamized Slavic, Christian origin, while some were of Turkic origin. The descendants of these families are recorded in numerous anthropological studies and have held important public offices.

Alajbegović family was a notable family in Bihać. Members of their family held titles “bey” and were notable lawyers and judges who have studied around the world, from Vienna and Paris to Algeria. Mehmed Alajbegović was a judge and later a minister of foreign affairs, whilst his father and grandfather were both mayors of Bihać. They had ties to the House of Habsburg and were connected to the Biščević family through the wedding of their son to Aziza Bišćević.
Avdić. family is a notable family in Herzegovina. Their ancestor Avdija Avdić was the builder of the famous Avdić mosque (Avdića džamija) in Plana in 1617. Allegedly the Avdić family originated from the Serb-Montenegrin Krivokapić family branch of the Kresojević clan. A prominent member was Avdo Krivokapić.  The Akkanat family who settled in Karamürsel/Turkey after 1877-78 Russo-Turkish War originate from the Avdić family.
Ajanović family is a notable family from Tešanj which arose from the class of ayans as semi-autonomus secular dignitaries.
Agačević. The most notable family in Travnik  (along with Begovac) at the turn of the 19th century.
Badanjković. Captains of Bosanska Krupa until early 18th century. Croat origin.
Bećirović family. Settled inTuzla surroundings since the 16th century and became governors of the Zvornik Sandzak.
Begovac family. Most notable family (along with Agačević) of Travnik at the turn of the 19th century.
Beširović family. Ostrožac. They are supposedly of Anatolian origin according to tradition. The most notable member was Osman-aga Beširović ( 1690–1727).
Bičakčić family. Sarajevo.
 Biščević family. Bihać. They were the most notable and richest family in Bihać. Mehmed beg Biščević was the captain of Bihać (position assumed in 1824) and held the title of pasha, one of the highest titles in the Ottoman Empire. Their ties were not only strong with the Ottomans, but later on also with the family of Franz Joseph, Emperor of Austria, as one of his sons was an adviser on the Habsburg royal court. Their numerous properties were confiscated after WW2. His daughter Aziza married into the Alajbegović family in Bihać.
Boljanić family. Orignated in the village Boljanići (old name was Bolehnići) near Pljevlja. The most notable member was Hüseyin Pasha Boljanić (d. 1595). 
Bukovac family.
Čengić family, produced several beys. Allegedly of Turkic origin, the family's most notable member was Smail-aga Čengić (1780–1840).
Ćerić family.
Ćerimović family.
Čurčić family. Sarajevo.
Đumišić family. Banja Luka.
Fidahić family. Captains of Zvornik.
Filipović family.
Gazibegović family. Gornja Orahovica
Glođa family. Sarajevo.
Gradaščević family. Gradačac. The progenitor was captain Osman Gradaščević (d. 1812).
Habul family. Bileća. The family moved primarily to the surroundings of Tuzla and Derventa during 1943. Refika, the last member born in Bileća, married into the Vugdalić family.
Hadžalić. Captains of Ljubuški between 1705 and 1814.
Hadži-Agić.
Hafizadić family. Travnik.
Hasanpašić family
Hrabren family. Active in the Stolac nahiya until the mid-17th century. They were famous Christian Vlach sipahi.
Ibrahimbegović. Gradačac.
Ibrahimpašić. Travnik.
Ibrahimpašić. Bosanska Krajina. The progenitor was Ibrahim-pasha, who was the son or grandson of Deli Murat-beg of Anadol (Anatolia).
Imaretlija family. Sarajevo.
Isabegović family, Isajbegović family.
Jahjapašić family.
Karabegović family. Prominent members were Husein-beg Karabegović, Ahmed-beg Karabegović, Halim-beg Karabegović, Srbin Avdo Karabegović Halidbegov and Avdo Karabegović Hasanbegov. The clan originated from the Budim Do village, near what today is the Zavala monastery in Ravno. At the beginning of the 18th century, four brothers from the clan left the village and migrated northward, settling in Zenica, Bihać, Mostar and Modriča, respectively.
Kasumagić family. Sarajevo. The most notable member was Kasim aga. The Kasumagić family produced a number of high-ranked officials in Sarajevo.
Kapetanović family. Ljubuški.
Kadić family (Kadizade). Foča.
Kadić family. Golubić, Bosanska Krajina (now Una-Sana Canton, near Bihać). The progenitor was Jašar, who was the son of Crni ("Black") Muhamed-aga of Anadol (Anatolia), who in turn was the son or grandson of Deli Murat-beg of Anadol.
Krupić family. Captains of Bosanska Krupa after the early 18th century.
Kulenović family. The most notable member was Mehmed-beg Kulenović (1776–1806).
Kulović family. Sarajevo. Allegedly served as janissaries.
Lafić family (Lafizade). Sarajevo.
Lakišić family. Old family of Mostar. They served as dizdar (fortress commander) of Mostar. According to one version, they hail from Konya. The family claim that their relatives still live in Konya.
Ljubović family (Lubzade). Nevesinje. A known member was Derviš-beg Ljubović who claimed Serbian origin.
Mekić. Most notable family from Kolašin. They held the Tara captaincy for centuries, and had multiple fortresses and fortified towers (Kula) in their hands.
Opijač, were a branch of the Miloradović-Stjepanović noble family. They remained in Žitomislić after the Ottoman conquest and converted to Islam taking Opijač as their collective surname. Today their descendants live in Dubrave near Stolac.
Osmanbegović.
Selimović family. Allegedly used to bear the surname Vujović hailing from Vranjska near Bileća. 
Sijerčić family Serb origin 
Sokolović family (Sokolluzade), produced several high-ranked officials. They originated from Serbian Orthodox Christians. The family's most notable member was Sokollu Mehmed Pasha, Grand Vizier (s. 1565–79).
Sulejmanpašić-Skopljak family. According to family member, Omer-beg, the family allegedly descends from the lord of a medieval fort and adjacent settlement, Vesela Straža, near what is today Bugojno. In the Middle Ages, this area was known under the name Uskoplje. Omer-beg also claimed that his ancestor, who was a Serb, accepted Islam after the conquest of Bosnia and was given the name Ali Pasha.
Resulbegović family. Albanian origin
Rizvanbegović family. Prominent nobility from Herzegovina of Serb origin. Most notable member was Ali Pasha Rizvanbegović.
Šahinpašić family. 
Šerifović family. From Sarajevo.
Šetka. From Herzegovina near Stolac
Skorbović family.
Šurković family.
Svrzo family. From Sarajevo.
Tanković family.
 Tuzlić family. Prominent Bosnian nobility from the region of Tuzla. The orignated from the Serbian nobleman Cvjetko Altomanović who governed Usora.
 Vugdalić family. Gračanica.
Zulfikarpašić family. Foča.
Zlatanović family.

References

Sources
 Prof. Dr. Feridun Emecen, TDV İslâm Ansiklopedisi, Turkish academic encyclopedia for Islamic studies, p. 524,525

Hazim Šabanović, Putopis : Odlomci o jugoslavenskim zemljama, 1967, Isabegzade p. 108, 109, 111, 263-264, 265, 282-283, 284, 286, 291
Evlya Čelebi Seyahatname
 Dr. Ćiro Truhelka, Tursko-slovjenski spomenici dubrovačke arhive, Glasnik Zemaljskog muzeja BiH XXIII. 1911. Sarajevo p. 437-484
 Amir Isajbegović, Kuća onih što sade dud - rekonstrukcija, Zagreb 2022. ISBN 978-953-49425-0-5

 
Ottoman
Lists of Bosnia and Herzegovina people
Bosnia and Herzegovina history-related lists